Herpetopoma elevatum is a species of sea snail, a marine gastropod mollusk in the family Chilodontaidae.

References

External links
 To World Register of Marine Species

elevatum
Gastropods described in 1994